Sakhli Ilman (also Romanized as Sākhlī Ilmān) is a village in Shirin Su Rural District, Maneh District, Maneh and Samalqan County, North Khorasan Province, Iran. At the 2006 census, its population was 308, in 70 families.

References 

Populated places in Maneh and Samalqan County